The 2003 Paris–Tours was the 97th edition of the Paris–Tours cycle race and was held on 5 October 2003. The race started in Saint-Arnoult-en-Yvelines and finished in Tours. The race was won by Erik Zabel of the Telekom team.

General classification

References

2003 in French sport
2003
Paris-Tours
2003 in road cycling
October 2003 sports events in France